Edward Forster may refer to:

 E. M. Forster (1879–1970), writer
 Edward Forster the Elder (1730–1812), English banker and antiquary
 Edward Forster the Younger (1765–1849), English banker and botanist, son of Edward Forster the Elder
 Edward Forster (writer) (1769–1828), English cleric and miscellaneous writer